Gary Tatintsian Gallery (Tatintsian Gallery) is one of the largest private contemporary art institutions, dedicated to exhibitions of the leading representatives of the world art scene. 

Owned and directed by Gary Tatintsian.

History
First opened in Chelsea, New York (1998), and later in downtown Moscow (2005) and in Alserkal Avenue in Dubai (2022), gallery focused on contemporary Western art, avant-garde of the early 20th century, photography and design.

Working in collaboration with the major Museums and Art Institutions worldwide, gallery organizes exhibitions of the top world-known masters of 21st century: Damien Hirst, George Condo, Chuck Close, Peter Saul, Carroll Dunham, John Currin, Francis Bacon, Peter Halley, Lee Ufan, Christopher Wool, Ron Arad, Wim Delvoye, Albert Oehlen and many others.

Gallery public program includes exhibitions and projects in the largest world museums: the State Hermitage Museum, The Pushkin State Museum of Fine Arts, Garage Museum of Contemporary Art, The New Museum, etc.

In addition to exhibition management, the gallery works with private and public collections, and also curates the foundation of the artist Evgeny Chubarov.

Artists represented

Ron Arad
Stephan Balkenhol
Olaf Breuning
Evgeny Chubarov
Chuck Close
George Condo
Mat Collishaw
John Currin
Wim Delvoye
Carroll Dunham
Peter Halley
Damien Hirst
Mike Kelley
Tony Matelli
John Miller
Yasumasa Morimura
Malcolm Morley 
Vik Muniz
Albert Oehlen
Anselm Reyle
Peter Saul 
Frank Stella
Lee Ufan
Keiichi Tanaami
Christopher Wool

List of exhibits

References

External links

Gary Tatintsian Gallery on Artsy
Tony Matelli Interview for RT channel
Gary Tatintsian Gallery / Speech Architectural Office on ArchDaily
Hunky Dory at Gary Tatintsian Gallery

1998 establishments in New York City
2005 establishments in Russia
Art museums and galleries in Russia
Contemporary art galleries in Russia
Contemporary art galleries in the United States